Tang Lung Chau is a islet located off the southern coast of Ma Wan island to the northwest of Hong Kong Island, Hong Kong. It is located within Tsuen Wan District of the New Territories.

Lighthouse

Tang Lung Chau Lighthouse and the former lightkeeper's house, located on Tang Lung Chau, was declared a monument on 29 December 2000.

The lighthouse, also commonly known as Kap Sing Lighthouse, was put into service on 29 April 1912; it is one of the five surviving pre-war . The steel tower and light apparatus were obtained from England. The lighthouse, unmanned and automated, is now under the management of the Marine Department.

There is a bedroom, a kitchen, a latrine and a store room in the adjoining brick light keeper's house. There was no spring or fresh water supply on the island so the light keeper of Tang Lung Chau Lighthouse used rainwater which was collected from the roof and then diverted into an underground tank.

See also

 List of lighthouses in Hong Kong
 Green Island Lighthouse Compound
 Cape D'Aguilar Lighthouse
 Waglan Lighthouse

Gallery

References

Further reading

External links

 Aerial view on Google Maps
 Map of Tang Lung Chau

Uninhabited islands of Hong Kong
Tsuen Wan District
Declared monuments of Hong Kong
Lighthouses in Hong Kong
Islands of Hong Kong